Carmen Domenic Licciardello (January 19, 1956 – February 16, 2021), known by his stage name Carman, was an American contemporary Christian music singer, rapper, songwriter, television host and evangelist. He was nominated for four Grammys, and sold over 10 million records.

Carman's album Mission 3:16 (1998) peaked at number 94 on the Billboard 200 chart. His album No Plan B (2014) peaked at number 66 on the Billboard 200, and at number 3 on the Top Christian Albums charts.

In addition to music, Carman was a frequent host on the Trinity Broadcasting Network, most notably its flagship program Praise the Lord

Early life and conversion
An Italian American, Carman was born in Trenton, New Jersey. As a child he performed in his mother's band. Carman played the drums at the age of 5, learned to play the guitar by the age of 15 and started singing at age 16. As a teen, he found some success performing at casinos in Atlantic City, New Jersey.

While attending an Andraé Crouch concert, Carman became a born again Christian, and embraced evangelical Christianity.

Music and television career
In 1980, Carman made a custom album titled God's Not Finished with Me. In 1981, he was invited by Bill Gaither to tour with the Bill Gaither Trio. 

After relocating to Tulsa, Oklahoma, Carman released a moderately successful eponymous debut album. Carman was later issued as Some-o-Dat in 1982. The album mostly contained novelty songs. With the release of his next album, Sunday's on the Way in 1983, Carman experienced a string of contemporary Christian music chart successes beginning with the title song. As he continued his music career, he established the nonprofit organization Carman Ministries. After the release of The Champion in 1985, Carman achieved his first number one song, by the same name. His first number one album on the Christian charts, Revival in the Land, followed in 1989.

Between 1987 and 1989, Carman was named Readers' Choice for Favorite Male Vocalist by Charisma magazine. In 1990 and 1992, Billboard named him the Contemporary Christian Artist of the Year. In 1995, he translated some of his songs, and released his first Spanish-language album, Lo Mejor. Heart of a Champion, a thirty-song retrospective was released in 2000.

Carman was nominated for four Grammys, and sold over 10 million records. It is believed he holds the world record for the largest single Christian concert in history. In August 1993, with more than 50,000 in attendance, Carman was the main act in Johannesburg, South Africa. The following year he performed a free concert at Texas Stadium October 22, 1994, with 71,132 attendees. Another concert had 80,000 in Chattanooga, Tennessee.

Beyond his music career, Carman participated in various television productions and interview duties as a host, for both the Trinity Broadcasting Network and its flagship program Praise the Lord. In 2001, he starred in the film Carman: The Champion.

In late March 2013, Carman announced a Kickstarter campaign for a new album and music video. A short time later, he announced an upcoming sixty-city tour, noting that the online fundraising campaign had raised more than $230,000 within several weeks.

Carman's musical style has been described by Relevant magazine as "operatic, story-driven songs that often centered around cosmic battles between God and Satan, similar to Frank Peretti by way of Meatloaf."

Personal life and health
In November 2011, Carman was the passenger in a car that was struck by a truck from oncoming traffic. The accident took place just outside the church where his appearance was scheduled. He performed the concert, but collapsed afterward and required surgery to repair internal injuries.

Carman began battling multiple myeloma cancer in 2013, and was given a prognosis of three to four years to live. By early 2014, he said medical tests indicated his body was free of cancer. He then continued preparing for his Live Across America album and tour. When the cancer went into remission, Carman attributed his healing to the faith of his fans. He pledged to his Facebook and Kickstarter supporters to begin his "No Plan B Tour" as soon as he regained his health. Later that year he toured the eastern United States.

In December 2017, at the age of 61, Carman married Dana Morrow. His new family included six stepchildren and nine step-grandchildren. 

In January 2020, Carman announced his cancer had returned. He resumed live concert church tours in June 2020.

Death
Carman died on February 16, 2021 (28 days after his 65th birthday) in a Las Vegas hospital, after a series of complications resulting from surgery to repair a hiatal hernia. He was survived by his wife, Dana, six stepchildren and nine step-grandchildren.

Discography and filmography
Source(s):
Selected list

 God's Not Finished with Me (1980)
 Some-o-Dat aka Carman (1982)
 Sunday's on the Way (1983)
 Comin' On Strong (1984)
 The Champion (1985)
 A Long Time Ago...in a Land Called Bethlehem (1986)
 Carman Live: Radically Saved (1988)
 Revival in the Land (1989)
 Shakin' the House Live (1991)
 Addicted to Jesus (1991)
 Yo Kidz! Heroes, Stories, and Songs from the Bible (1992)
 Yo Kidz! Lawrence the Kat and the B. Attitudes (1993)
 The Standard (1993)
 Yo Kidz! Vol. 2: The Armor of God (1994)
 Lo Mejor (1995)
 Christmas with Carman (1995)
 R.I.O.T. (Righteous Invasion of Truth) (1995)
 Yo Kidz! Lawrence the Kat and the Bible (1996)
 I Surrender All: 30 Classic Hymns (1997)
 Mission 3:16 (1998)
 Passion for Praise Vol. 1 (1999)
 Heart of a Champion (2000)
 House of Praise (2002)
 Instrument of Praise (2007)
 No Plan B (2014)
 Legacy (2017)

Awards and nominations

Carman was inducted into the Gospel Music Hall of Fame in 2018.

References

External links
 
 
 Carman Licciardello at Find a Grave

1956 births
2021 deaths
20th-century American male singers
20th-century evangelicals
21st-century American male singers
21st-century American rappers
21st-century evangelicals
American evangelicals
American male rappers
American people of Italian descent
American performers of Christian music
Christian music songwriters
Musicians from Nashville, Tennessee
Musicians from Trenton, New Jersey
People with multiple myeloma